Survival Island can refer to the following:

 Survival Island, a 2005 movie
 Survival Island 3 - Australia Story, a 2015 video game